Ángel Faus Belau (9 February 1936 – 30 August 2020) was a Spanish journalist and professor emeritus of communications at the University of Navarre. He was considered a leading expert on European radio broadcasting. In 1979, he became the first Spaniard to earn a doctorate in information sciences.

In his book, "La radio en España (1896-1977). Una historia documental", Faus argued that Julio Cervera Baviera, a Spanish engineer, was the actual inventor of the radio, rather than Guglielmo Marconi. Faus published more than 300 books, articles and scholarly journals during his career.

Ángel Faus Belau died in Castellón de la Plana on 30 August 2020, at the age of 84. He was survived by his wife, María Luis Alcaraz Castelló, and their five children - María Luisa, María Ángeles, Ángel, Begoña, and Luis Faus Alcaraz. His funeral was held at Castelló Cathedral in Castellón de la Plana on 31 August 2020.

References

1936 births
2020 deaths
Spanish journalists
Journalists from the Valencian Community
Spanish radio presenters
Spanish radio journalists
Academic staff of the University of Navarra
University of Navarra alumni
People from Villarreal